Notosyodon is an extinct genus of non-mammalian therapsids. The holotype PIN 2505/1, consists of a partial skull preserving the orbital, occipital, and basicranial regions. Other remains include PIN 2505/2, a right lower incisor, and PIN 2505/3, a left upper postcanine, found associated with the holotype and PIN 2608/1, the anterior half of a left dentary found on the right bank of the Donguz River, near Dolmatovskii Farm, Sol-Iletsk District, Orenburg Region, Russia.

See also

 List of therapsids

References

 The main groups of non-mammalian synapsids at Mikko's Phylogeny Archive

Anteosaurs
Prehistoric therapsid genera
Guadalupian synapsids of Europe
Permian synapsids of Asia
Fossil taxa described in 1968
Guadalupian genus first appearances
Guadalupian genus extinctions